Acompáñame (English: Accompany me) is a studio album by Mexican pop singers Yuri and Mijares. Released on 25 April 2006, the idea to record together came after both had previously performed at the Auditorio Nacional in Mexico City. The album consisted mostly of some of the most beloved Spanish love songs from the 1980s.  The lead single was non-cover track “Y Llegaste Tú".  In interviews, Yuri stated that, “Upon the initial invitation by Mijares to record together, I felt this was the perfect moment for this record”. It went on to sell more than 100,000 earning Platinum disc.

Reception
Yuri and Manuel Mijares got together and decided to make this album of covers from one of the most successful songs in Spanish from the 80's. This album reaches first place in the Mexican charts, selling more than 100,000 despite the low promotion of Sony Music. With this album Yuri regained her fame and she went on tour titled Cantar por cantar (Sing just to sing) where she performed with Mijares and Ricardo Montaner.

Track listing
Tracks []:

Production
 Executive producer: Guillermo Gil
 Arrangers: Guillermo Gil; Pancho Ruiz; Eugenio Toussaint; Mario Santos
 Recording Studio: La Bodega Mexico, D. F; Westlake Audio, Los Angeles, CA.
 Musicians: Paco Rosas (Acoustic guitar, Electric guitar); Ramón Stagnaro (Acoustic guitar); Marco Antonio Santiago (Bajo sexto); Fernando de Santiago, Guillermo Gil (Didjeridu); Mario Santos (Piano and keyboards); Guillermo Gil, Beto Dominguez (Percussion)
 Audio Mixers: Juan Barbosa, Guillermo Gil
 Photographer: Carlos Latapi

Singles
 Callados
 Acompañame

References

2006 albums
Yuri (Mexican singer) albums
Manuel Mijares albums